GraphCalc is an open-source computer program that runs in Microsoft Windows and Linux that provides the functionality of a graphing calculator.

GraphCalc includes many of the standard features of graphing calculators, but also includes some higher-end features:
 High resolution
 Graphing calculator screens have a resolution typically less than 120×90 pixels, whereas computer monitors typically display 1280x1024 pixels or more.
 Speed
 Modern computers are considerably faster than handheld graphing calculators
 Three-dimensional graphing
 While high-end graphing calculators can graph in 3-D, GraphCalc benefits from modern computers' memory, speed, and graphics acceleration (OpenGL)

GraphCalc was developed by Brendan Fields and Mike Arrison, computer science students at Bucknell University, before graduating in 2000.  Mike continued the development briefly from 2001–2003, but has since abandoned the project. Other similar projects being maintained are KAlgebra and Cantor.

See also 

 NuCalc (also known as Graphing Calculator)

External links
 GraphCalc Official website
 SourceForge project page
 KAlgebra official site
 Cantor official site

Free plotting software
Free software programmed in C++
Plotting software
Science software for Windows
Science software for Linux
2000 software
Free educational software